was a town located in Saga District, Saga Prefecture, Japan.

As of 2006, the town had an estimated population of 18,492 and a density of 398 persons per km2. Its total area was 46.49 km2.

On October 1, 2007, Kawasoe, along with the towns of Higashiyoka and Kubota (all from Saga District), was merged into the expanded city of Saga.

Saga Airport was located in the former territory of Kawasoe.

Climate

References

Dissolved municipalities of Saga Prefecture